Dobrzyca  is a village in the administrative district of Gmina Będzino, within Koszalin County, West Pomeranian Voivodeship, in north-western Poland. It is located in the historic region of Pomerania.

Notable sights include the Holy Trinity church and the Hortulus and Hortulus Spectabilis botanical gardens. The latter contains the world's largest hornbeam labyrinth.

The village has an approximate population of 800.

References

Dobrzyca